Mümtaz Çeçen (1876 – 3 November 1941) was an officer of the Ottoman Army and the Turkish Army.

Medals and decorations
Order of the Medjidie 4th and 5th class
Imtiyaz Medal of the Battle of Greece
Silver Liakat Medal
Silver Imtiyaz Medal
Iron Cross of 1914, 1st and 2nd class (Prussia)
Medal of Independence with Red Ribbon

See also
List of high-ranking commanders of the Turkish War of Independence

Sources

1876 births
1941 deaths
Military personnel from Istanbul
Ottoman Military Academy alumni
Ottoman Army officers
Ottoman military personnel of the Greco-Turkish War (1897)
Ottoman military personnel of the Italo-Turkish War
Ottoman military personnel of the Balkan Wars
Ottoman military personnel of World War I
Turkish Army officers
Turkish military personnel of the Greco-Turkish War (1919–1922)
Burials at Turkish State Cemetery
Recipients of the Order of the Medjidie, 4th class
Recipients of the Silver Liakat Medal
Recipients of the Silver Imtiyaz Medal
Recipients of the Iron Cross (1914), 1st class
Recipients of the Medal of Independence with Red Ribbon (Turkey)